São José dos Ausentes is a municipality with an average altitude of 1200 meters, in the state of Rio Grande do Sul, Brazil. Its population was approximately 3,543 in 2020. It has an area of approximately 1176 km². Pico do Monte Negro is located in São José dos Ausentes, with its peak 1403 meters above sea level. It is the highest point in Rio Grande do Sul State. The town is 220 km far from state's capital, Porto Alegre.

Climate
São José dos Ausentes features an Oceanic climate (type Cfb), It features an annual uniform precipitation. The Annual average temperature is 13 °C
The city is one of the coldest in Brazil and snow precipitation is not uncommon.

See also
List of municipalities in Rio Grande do Sul

References

Municipalities in Rio Grande do Sul